The General Confederation of Labour (CGT) is a national trade union center, founded in 1895 in the city of Limoges. It is the first of the five major French confederations of trade unions.

It is the largest in terms of votes (32.1% at the 2002 professional election, 34.0% in the 2008 election), and second largest in terms of membership numbers.

Its membership decreased to 650,000 members in 1995–96 (it had more than doubled when François Mitterrand was elected president in 1981), before increasing today to between 700,000 and 720,000 members, slightly fewer than the Confédération Française Démocratique du Travail (CFDT).

According to the historian M. Dreyfus, the direction of the CGT is slowly evolving, since the 1990s, during which it cut all organic links with the French Communist Party (PCF), in favour of a more moderate stance. The CGT is concentrating its attention, in particular since the 1995 general strikes, to trade-unionism in the private sector.

History

1895 to 1947

1895: Creation 

The CGT was founded in 1895 in Limoges from the merger of the Fédération des bourses du travail (Federation of Labour Councils) and the Fédération nationale des syndicats (National Federation of Trade Unions). Auguste Keufer was amongst the founders and became the first treasurer.

1895–1914: Anarcho-syndicalism 

Up until 1919 the CGT was dominated by anarcho-syndicalist tendencies, with Émile Pouget as vice-secretary and leader of the union from 1906 to 1909. The CGT was violently opposed to both the authorities and employers. Moreover, it refused to become affiliated with a political party.

In 1906, the Amiens Charter (Charte d'Amiens) proclaimed the independence of this trade union.

In 1909, members of the union management and hundreds of CGT members were killed by the French government led by Georges Clemenceau, who called the troops to open fire on the strikers.

World War I: Dissension 

Under the leadership of Léon Jouhaux, the Confederation joined the "sacred union" to not call work stoppages during World War I, which provoked the CGT's first internal division. Such labor stoppages were a point of contention within the European political left of the era. While Jouhaux tried to associate the CGT with the authorities, his opponents criticized the pervasive air of nationalism and the preference for struggle with the German proletarians rather than the French employers. They welcomed news of the 1917 Russian October Revolution with hope.

In 1919, Pierre Monatte created the Revolutionary Syndicalist Committees (Comités syndicalistes révolutionnaires) current inside the CGT, which opposed the trade-union's collaboration with the government during the war; carried out in the name of the Union sacrée national bloc.

The hope of October 1917 

Following the Russian Revolution, the French labour movement became increasingly divided between revolutionaries who supported the Bolsheviks and strong action at home, and reformists who favoured moderation and re-affiliation to the pre-war Second International.
One outcome of this division was the expulsion of the revolutionaries.
Following the 1920 Tours Congress during which the majority of French Section of the Workers' International (SFIO) members voted to accept Vladimir Ilyich Lenin's 21 Conditions, leading to the creation of the French Section of the Communist International (SFIC), the CGT also split.

Radicals created the Confédération générale du travail unitaire (CGTU), where communists initially cohabited with anarchists and revolutionary trade unionists.

Reconciliation and World War II 

In 1934, left-wing parties united to counteract the far-right "ligues".

Two years later, the Popular Front won the 1936 legislative election.

At the same time, the CGT and the CGTU were reunited. Benoît Frachon negotiated in June with employers and the Government for the 1936 Matignon Agreements. Nevertheless, the Communists were as a result of the German-Soviet pact in 1939, then the CGT was dissolved by the Vichy government but it transformed itself into an organization in the Resistance.

It became increasingly influenced by the French Communist Party.

1945 to 1947 : Division 

After the ejection of the Communists from the government and the 1947 General Strike, a further split took place, this time involving the departure of the reformist Right, followed in 1948, when Léon Jouhaux founded Workers' Force (Force ouvrière or FO) with U.S. Central Intelligence Agency support .

The FO criticized the Communist influence as being incompatible with the Charte d'Amiens; and they were generally  socialist,  some trotskyist, some anarchist.

In order to preserve its unity, the Federation for National Education (Fédération de l'Education nationale or FEN) left the CGT but did not join the FO.

The Communist Benoît Frachon became leader of the CGT.

1947 to 1990s : The domination of the French Communist Party

Alliance and Union of the Left 

Although the CGT was dominant in French trade unionism, it was isolated until 1966.
At this moment, it chose to coordinate its actions with the French Democratic Confederation of Labour (Confédération française démocratique du travail or CFDT).

During May 1968 in France, the CGT was criticized by the far-left because its leader Georges Séguy had signed the Grenelle agreements with Prime Minister Georges Pompidou, it was assimilated as a betrayal of the revolution.

In the 1970s, it supported the "Union of Left" (alliance between the French Communist Party (PCF), Socialist Party (PS) and Parti Radical de Gauche (PRG)).

After the defeat of the 1978 legislative election, the alliance with the CFDT (who were more linked with the Socialist Party and turned right after the abandon of the "autogestion" (self-rule) and class struggle) was broken.

The 1980s 

The election of Henri Krasucki in 1982, followed by the resignation of the Communist ministers (Charles Fiterman, Marcel Rigout and Jack Ralite) two years later, after the substitution of Laurent Fabius as Prime minister to Pierre Mauroy, led to an initial radicalisation of the confederation.

However, at the end of his term (1982–1992), Krasucki began to distance himself from the PCF.  His successor, Louis Viannet, did the same, going as far as resigning from the political bureau of the party.  Thus, during the 1990s, under the leadership of Viannet and Bernard Thibault, the CGT cut its organic links with the French Communist Party. It has succeeded in remaining one of the two major French union confederations, while the Communist Party has declined severely.

From the 1995 general strike to today 

It was the leading trade-union in the 1995 general strike against Alain Juppé's plan of Welfare State reforms (in particular concerning pensions).

The CGT also protested against Union for a Popular Movement (UMP) minister François Fillon's project of pensions reforms in 2003.

In February 2005, the National Confederate Committee (CCN), the "Parliament" of the trade-union, rejected national secretary Bernard Thibault's support of the Treaty establishing a Constitution for Europe (TCE).

Therefore, the CGT actively supported the "NO" during the 2005 referendum on the TCE, criticizing its neo-liberal orientation and weaknesses concerning the few democratic measures about the working of the European Union (EU) institutions.

In autumn 2005, the Marseillese section of the CGT, representing the more radical faction opposed to Bernard Thibault's more centrist views, demonstrated against the privatization of the SNCM ship company.
The CGT then supported the student movement during the 2006 protests against the Contrat première embauche (CPE, First Employment Contract).

It supported the movement against the El Khomri law on labor in spring 2016.

The CGT left the Communist-oriented World Federation of Trade Unions at its 1995 congress and became a member of the European Trade Union Confederation in 1999. It is also a member of the International Trade Union Confederation (ITUC) created in 2006.

However, several federations and regional branches of the CGT are affiliated to the WFTU.

Professional elections

The CGT won 34% of the vote in the employee's college during the 2008 professional elections, making it the largest trade union in terms of votes in those elections. This positive result marked the first professional election in which the CGT's vote share had not declined: it had declined constantly from 36.35% in 1987 to 32.13% in 2002.

In Africa

In 1937 CGT began organizing workers in French West Africa. The union's functioning was interrupted by its banning by the Vichy regime, but in 1943-1948 a process of reconstruction took place. The main centers of activity were Senegal, Ivory Coast, Togo and the French Soudan. CGT had an upper hand in the Muslim regions in comparison to its main rival CFTC, who depended on the presence of Catholic communities for its recruitment. CGT emerged as the major trade union force amongst the 100 000 strong organized labour force in Senegal and Mauritania after the Second World War.

Within the CGT branches in the region, there was however a growing wish for independence. A leader of CGT in French West Africa, Bassirou Guèye, promoted this idea. At a meeting of the Territorial Union of Trade Unions in Senegal and Mauritania, held in Dakar November 11–November 12, 1955, the majority of delegates voted for separation from the French CGT. A conference was held in Saint-Louis on January 14–January 15, 1956 which formed the Confédération générale des travailleurs africains (CGTA), separating the parts of the West African CGT organizations from the French CGT. At the conference 50 out of 67 delegates had voted for separation.

In Togo, CGT had 45,100 members in 1948 (65% of organized labour). By 1952 the number had decreased to 34,000 (46% of organized labour).

CGT formed a branch in Madagascar in 1936.

Support of week of global climate action
On July 16, 2019 Phillipe Martinez, Secretary General of the CGT, announced that the union will support the week of climate action beginning on September 20, 2019.

Affiliates

Federations

Other affiliates
Federal Union of State Trade Unions (UFSE)
General Union of Engineers, Managers and Technicians CGT (UGICT)
Confederation of CGT retirees' union (UCR)
Young CGT
National Committee for the Fight and Defense of the Unemployed

Former federations

Leadership

General Secretaries

See also

 List of trade unions
Anarchism in France
 Politics of France
 CGT-SR
 Trade unions:
 French Democratic Confederation of Labour
 French Confederation of Christian Workers
 Workers' Force
 French Confederation of Management – General Confederation of Executives
 Solidaires Unitaires Démocratiques
 Mouvement des Entreprises de France

Footnotes

Further reading
 Ross, George. Workers and Communists in France: From Popular Front to Eurocommunism (1982).

External links

The beginnings of the CGT, 1895–1921 An account and analysis of the anarchist origins of the CGT, and the later rise of the Communist Party within it.

 
National trade union centers of France
Trade unions in France
European Trade Union Confederation
1895 establishments in France
Trade unions established in 1895